In Greek mythology, Aello (Aellō means "storm" or "storm-swift" in ancient Greek) was one of the Harpy sisters who would abduct people and torture them on their way to Tartarus. It is claimed she is the mother of Achilles's immortal steeds Balius (Balios) and Xanthus (Xanthos) by Zephyrus, but some sources claim it was really her sister Celaeno.

She is also referred to as:

Aellopus (Ἀελλόπους, Aellopous, "whirlwind-footed")
Aellope (Αελλώπη, Aellōpē)
Podarge (Ποδάργη, Podargē, "she who is foot-speedy")
Podarce (Ποδάρκη, Podarkē, "she who is foot-safe"?)
Nicothoë (Νικοθόη, Nikothoē, "she who is victory-speedy")

Aello was also the name of one of Actaeon's dogs who destroyed their master when he was changed into a stag by the goddess of hunt, Artemis.

Notes

References 

 Apollodorus, The Library with an English Translation by Sir James George Frazer, F.B.A., F.R.S. in 2 Volumes, Cambridge, MA, Harvard University Press; London, William Heinemann Ltd. 1921. . Online version at the Perseus Digital Library. Greek text available from the same website.
Bell, Robert E., Women of Classical Mythology: A Biographical Dictionary. ABC-Clio. 1991. .
Gaius Julius Hyginus, Fabulae from The Myths of Hyginus translated and edited by Mary Grant. University of Kansas Publications in Humanistic Studies. Online version at the Topos Text Project.
 Hesiod, Theogony from The Homeric Hymns and Homerica with an English Translation by Hugh G. Evelyn-White, Cambridge, MA.,Harvard University Press; London, William Heinemann Ltd. 1914. Online version at the Perseus Digital Library. Greek text available from the same website.
 Homer, The Iliad with an English Translation by A.T. Murray, Ph.D. in two volumes. Cambridge, MA., Harvard University Press; London, William Heinemann, Ltd. 1924. . Online version at the Perseus Digital Library.
Homer, Homeri Opera in five volumes. Oxford, Oxford University Press. 1920. . Greek text available at the Perseus Digital Library.
Publius Ovidius Naso, Metamorphoses translated by Brookes More (1859-1942). Boston, Cornhill Publishing Co. 1922. Online version at the Perseus Digital Library.
Publius Ovidius Naso, Metamorphoses. Hugo Magnus. Gotha (Germany). Friedr. Andr. Perthes. 1892. Latin text available at the Perseus Digital Library.

External link 

 Godchecker - Aello

Legendary birds
Harpies
Characters in Greek mythology